Garryfliugh is a townland in the civil parish of Drumreilly, barony of Tullyhaw, County Cavan, Ireland.

Geography

Garryfliugh is bounded on the west by Doon (Drumreilly), Knockfin and Seltanahunshin townlands and on the east by Ardmoneen, Corraleehanbeg and Drumderg townlands. Its chief geographical features are Sliabh an Iarainn mountain on whose eastern slope it lies, reaching a height of 1,250 feet, a waterfall, forestry plantations, woods, mountain streams and dug wells. It is traversed by minor public roads and rural lanes. The townland covers 304 statute acres.

History

The Battle of Magh Slecht took place in the townland in 1256 between the O’Rourkes and the O’Reillys. Dead bodies from the battle are sometimes discovered buried in the townland.

The landlord of Garryfliugh in the 19th century was the Beresford Estate.

The Tithe Applotment Books for 1834 spells the name as Garfullagh and list five tithepayers in the townland.

Griffith's Valuation of 1857 lists eleven landholders in the townland.

Census

In the 1901 census of Ireland, there were ten families listed in the townland.

In the 1911 census of Ireland, there were ten families listed in the townland.

Antiquities

 Stone bridges over the streams
 Stepping-stones over the stream

References

External links
The IreAtlas Townland Data Base

Townlands of County Cavan